The Saga of the Sanpitch was a collection of biographical short stories, published annually from 1969 to 1998, about early Scandinavian immigrants to the Sanpete Valley.

External links
 Digitized collection at the University of Utah Library
 Saga of the Sanpitch in PDF

Sanpete County, Utah
Publications established in 1969